The Beth Elamen Jewish cemetery, is the only Jewish graveyard in Lebanon's capital Beirut.

Location 
The cemetery is located close to Sodeco Square in the Achrafieh district of Beirut and accessible through a gate the Damascus Road, also known as "Rue de Damas".

History 
The graveyard was established in 1829, when the Rabbi Moïse Yedid Levy was buried there. In the following two centuries, more than 3,000 Lebanese Jews were buried there.

During the Lebanese Civil War (1975–1990) the cemetery was at the Green Line of demarcation line which separated the predominantly Muslim part of West Beirut from the predominantly Christian East Beirut controlled. Beth Elamen was controlled far-right Phalanges of the Lebanese Front, which used land mines to keep its opponents from crossing the cemetery. Several graves were hit and damaged by rockets and shells during the conflict, but the cemetery was never hit by desecration. After the war, it was de-mined by the Lebanese Armed Forces.

See also
 Maghen Abraham Synagogue
 Wadi Abu Jamil
 History of the Jews in Lebanon

Footnotes and references

External links
 
 Beirut Jewish Civil Cemetery – Commonwealth War Grave Commission

Beirut
Jews and Judaism in Beirut